Baron Rockley, of Lytchett Heath in the County of Dorset, is a title in the peerage of the United Kingdom. It was created on 11 January 1934 for the Conservative politician Sir Evelyn Cecil, who had earlier represented Hertfordshire East, Aston Manor and Birmingham Aston in the House of Commons. He was the son of Lord Eustace Cecil, fourth son of James Gascoyne-Cecil, 2nd Marquess of Salisbury. The first baron was married to the horticulturist Alicia Amherst.  the title is held by their great-grandson, the fourth baron, who succeeded his father in 2011.

Barons Rockley (1934)
Evelyn Cecil, 1st Baron Rockley (1865–1941)
Robert William Evelyn Cecil, 2nd Baron Rockley (1901–1976)
James Hugh Cecil, 3rd Baron Rockley (1934–2011)
Anthony Robert Cecil, 4th Baron Rockley (b. 1961)

The heir apparent is the present holder's son Hon. William Evelyn Cecil (b. 1996).

Arms

See also
Marquess of Salisbury
Marquess of Exeter
Viscount Cecil of Chelwood
Baron Quickswood
Viscount Wimbledon
Baron Amherst of Hackney

Notes

References
 Kidd, Charles, Williamson, David (editors). Debrett's Peerage and Baronetage (1990 edition). New York: St Martin's Press, 1990,

External links

Baronies in the Peerage of the United Kingdom
Noble titles created in 1934
Noble titles created for UK MPs
!